The uranyl ion is an oxycation of uranium in the oxidation state +6, with the chemical formula . It has a linear structure with short U–O bonds, indicative of the presence of multiple bonds between uranium and oxygen. Four or more ligands may be bound to the uranyl ion in an equatorial plane around the uranium atom. The uranyl ion forms many complexes, particularly with ligands that have oxygen donor atoms. Complexes of the uranyl ion are important in the extraction of uranium from its ores and in nuclear fuel reprocessing.

Structure and bonding

The uranyl ion is linear and symmetrical, with both U–O bond lengths of about 180 pm. The bond lengths are indicative of the presence of multiple bonding between the uranium and oxygen atoms. Since uranium(VI) has the electronic configuration of the preceding noble gas, radon, the electrons used in forming the U–O bonds are supplied by the oxygen atoms. The electrons are donated into empty atomic orbitals on the uranium atom. The empty orbitals of lowest energy are 7s, 5f and 6d. In terms of valence bond theory, the sigma bonds may be formed using dz2 and fz3 to construct sd, sf and df hybrid orbitals (the z-axis passes through the oxygen atoms). (dxz, dyz) and (fxz2 and fyz2) may be used to form pi bonds. Since the pair of d or f orbitals used in bonding are doubly degenerate, this equates to an overall bond order of three.

The uranyl ion is always associated with other ligands. The most common arrangement is for the so-called equatorial ligands to lie in a plane perpendicular to the O–U–O line and passing through the uranium atom. With four ligands, as in [UO2Cl4]2−, the uranium has a distorted octahedral environment. In many cases more than four  ligands occupy the equator. 

In uranyl fluoride, UO2F2, the uranium atom achieves a coordination number of 8 by forming a layer structure with two oxygen atoms in a uranyl configuration and six fluoride ions bridging between uranyl groups. A similar structure is found in α-uranium trioxide, with oxygen in place of fluoride, except that in that case the layers are connected by sharing oxygen atom from "uranyl groups", which are identified by having relatively short U–O distances. A similar structure occurs in some uranates, such as calcium uranate, CaUO4, which may be written as Ca(UO2)O2 even though the structure does not contain isolated uranyl groups.

Spectroscopy 

The colour of uranyl compounds is due to ligand-to-metal charge transfer transitions at ca. 420 nm, on the blue edge of the visible spectrum. The exact location of the absorption band and NEXAFS bands depends on the nature of the equatorial ligands. Compounds containing the uranyl ion are usually yellow, though some compounds are red, orange or green.

Uranyl compounds also exhibit luminescence. The first study of the green luminescence of uranium glass, by Brewster in 1849, began extensive studies of the spectroscopy of the uranyl ion. Detailed understanding of this spectrum was obtained  130 years later. It is now well-established that the uranyl luminescence is more specifically a phosphorescence, as it is due to a transition from the lowest triplet excited state to the singlet ground state. The luminescence from K2UO2(SO4)2 was involved in the discovery of radioactivity.

The uranyl ion has characteristic νU–O stretching vibrations at ca. 880 cm−1 (Raman spectrum) and 950 cm−1 (infrared spectrum). These frequencies depend somewhat on which ligands are present in the equatorial plane. Correlations are available between the stretching frequency and U–O bond length. It has also been observed that the stretching frequency correlates with the position of the equatorial ligands in the spectrochemical series.

Aqueous chemistry 

The aqueous uranyl ion is a weak acid.
[UO2(H2O)4]2+  [UO2(H2O)3(OH)]+ + H+; pKa = ca. 4.2

As pH increases polymeric species with stoichiometry [(UO2)2(OH)2]2+ and [(UO2)3(OH)5]+ are formed before the hydroxide UO2(OH)2 precipitates. The hydroxide dissolves in strongly alkaline solution to give hydroxo complexes of the uranyl ion.

The uranyl ion can be reduced by mild reducing agents, such as zinc metal, to the oxidation state +4. Reduction to uranium(III) can be done using a Jones reductor.

Complexes 

The uranyl ion behaves as a hard acceptor and forms weaker complexes with nitrogen-donor ligands than with fluoride and oxygen donor ligands, such as hydroxide, carbonate, nitrate, sulfate and carboxylate. There may be 4, 5 or 6 donor atoms in the equatorial plane. In uranyl nitrate, [UO2(NO3)2]·2H2O, for example, there are six donor atoms in the equatorial plane, four from bidentate nitrato ligands and two from water molecules. The structure is described as hexagonal bipyramidal. Other oxygen-donor ligands include phosphine oxides and phosphate esters.
Uranyl nitrate, UO2(NO3)2, can be extracted from aqueous solution into diethyl ether. The complex that is extracted has two nitrato ligands bound to the uranyl ion, making a complex with no electrical charge and also the water molecules are replaced by ether molecules, giving the whole complex notable hydrophobic character. Electroneutrality is the most important factor in making the complex soluble in organic solvents. The nitrate ion forms much stronger complexes with the uranyl ion than it does with transition metal and lanthanide ions. For this reason only uranyl and other actinyl ions, including the plutonyl ion, can be extracted from mixtures containing other ions. Replacing the water molecules that are bound to the uranyl ion in aqueous solution by a second, hydrophobic, ligand increases the solubility of the neutral complex in the organic solvent. This has been called a synergic effect.

The complexes formed by the uranyl ion in aqueous solution are of major importance both in the extraction of uranium from its ores and in nuclear fuel reprocessing. In industrial processes, uranyl nitrate is extracted with tributyl phosphate (TBP, (CH3CH2CH2CH2O)3PO) as the preferred second ligand and kerosene the preferred organic solvent. Later in the process, uranium is stripped from the organic solvent by treating it with strong nitric acid, which forms complexes such as [UO2(NO3)4]2− which are more soluble in the aqueous phase. Uranyl nitrate is recovered by evaporating the solution.

Minerals 
The uranyl ion occurs in minerals derived from uranium ore deposits by water-rock interactions that occur in uranium-rich mineral seams. Examples of uranyl containing minerals include: 

 silicates: uranophane (H3O)2Ca(UO2)2(SiO4)·3H2O)
 phosphates: autunite (Ca(UO2)2(PO4)2·8–12H2O), torbernite (Cu(UO2)2(PO4)·8–12H2O)
 arsenates: arsenuranospathite (Al(UO2)2(AsO4)2F·20H2O) 
 vanadates: carnotite (K2(UO2)2(VO4)2·3H2O), tyuyamunite (Ca(UO2)2V2O8·8H2O) 
 carbonates: schröckingerite NaCa3(UO2)(CO3)3(SO4)F·10H2O
 oxalates: uroxite [(UO2)2(C2O4)(OH)2(H2O)2]·H2O. 

These minerals are of little commercial value as most uranium is extracted from pitchblende.

Uses 
Uranyl salts are used to stain samples for electron and electromagnetic microscopy studies of DNA.

Health and environmental issues
Uranyl salts are toxic and can cause severe chronic kidney disease and acute tubular necrosis. Target organs include the kidneys, liver, lungs and brain. Uranyl ion accumulation in tissues including gonocytes produces congenital disorders, and in white blood cells causes immune system damage. Uranyl compounds are also neurotoxins. Uranyl ion contamination has been found on and around depleted uranium targets.

All uranium compounds are radioactive. However, uranium is usually in depleted form, except in the context of the nuclear industry.

References 

 
Oxycations